Pierre-Alfred Daviault (November 9, 1899 – November 18, 1964) was a Canadian translator and author. He helped to create the first professional translation courses in Canada.

Life
Born in Saint-Jérôme, Quebec, the son of Philippe-Landry Daviault and Clothilde Lauzon, he studied at the University of Montreal and at the Sorbonne.

From 1958 to 1959, he was president of the Royal Society of Canada and was awarded its Pierre Chauveau Medal in 1952.

Selected works
 Le Mystère des Mille-Îles, 1927
 L'Expression juste en traduction, 1931
 Questions de langue, 1933
 La Grande Aventure de Le Moyne d'Iberville, 1934
 Traduction, 1941
 Nora l'énigmatique, 1945
 Language et traduction, 1961

References
 Fonds Pierre-Daviault 
 A Pioneer of translator training in Canada

1899 births
1964 deaths
People from Saint-Jérôme
Writers from Quebec
University of Paris alumni
20th-century Canadian translators
Canadian expatriates in France